Río Mayo Airport  is a public use airport  south of Río Mayo, Chubut, Argentina.

The Rio Mayo non-directional beacon (Ident: RMY) is located on the field.

See also

Transport in Argentina
List of airports in Argentina

References

External links
OpenStreetMap - Río Mayo Airport
OurAirports - Río Mayo Airport
FallingRain - Río Mayo Airport

Airports in Argentina
Chubut Province